The 50/50 Burger patty  is a half ground bacon, half ground beef burger patty developed by Scott Slater for Slater's 50/50 restaurant. The 50/50 Burger consists of a 50% ground bacon and 50% ground beef patty topped with a sunny side up egg, avocado mash, pepper jack cheese and chipotle adobo mayo on a hamburger bun.

Slater's 50/50 restaurant has also created a kangaroo burger that is composed of half kangaroo meat and half bacon.

Slater’s 50/50 restaurants
As of April 2018, there are nine Slater's 50/50 restaurants, seven are located in Southern California, one in Dallas and one in Las Vegas.

See also

 List of hamburgers

References

50/50 Burger Battle Erupts Between Ballpark Concessionaire And Slater's. Huffington Post.

External links
 Slater’s 50/50 Gives Burger Lovers Something to be Thankful For in November | RestaurantNews.com

Hamburgers (food)